Choryasi (Surat) is one of the 182 Legislative Assembly constituencies of Gujarat state in India. It is part of Surat district.

List of segments
This assembly seat represents the following segments,

 Choryasi Taluka (Part) Villages – Bhatlai, Rajgari, Sunvali, Mora, Kavas, Bhatpor, Kidiabet, Bhatha, Rundh, Magdalla, Gaviyar, Vanta, Dumas, Hajira, Sultanabad, Bhimpor, Sarsana, Abhva, Khajod, Bhimrad, Jiav, Sonari, Karadva, Saniya Kanade, Eklera, Bhanodra, Gabheni, Budia, Talangpor, Pardi Kanade, Kharvasa, Pali, Umber, Kansad, Bamroli, Palanpor, Bharthan, Vadod, Gadodara, Dindoli, Vesu, Pal, Ichchhapor (CT), Parvat (CT), Limla (CT), Hajira (INA), Un (CT), Sachin (CT), Sachin (INA)

Member of Legislative Assembly

Election results

2022

2017

2012

2007

See also
 List of constituencies of the Gujarat Legislative Assembly
 Surat district
 Gujarat Legislative Assembly

References

External links
 

Assembly constituencies of Gujarat
Surat district